Laurence Frederic Rushbrook Williams,  (1890–1978) was a British historian and civil servant who spent part of his working life in India, and had an abiding interest in Eastern culture.

Life and work
Williams was a Fellow of All Souls' College, Oxford. He built up a school of Mughal studies at the University of Allahabad, where he was professor of Modern Indian History. He was briefly Eastern Services Director of the B.B.C., and also worked on the editorial staff of The Times (London). He acted as a government advisor on Middle East and Asian affairs, and contributed to publications like the Royal Central Asian Society Journal and the Encyclopædia Britannica.

He became interested in Sufism through his contact with Sirdar Ikbal Ali Shah and later edited an anthology of contributions to a symposium in honor of the work of the noted Sufi author, Idries Shah.

Works
Williams wrote several works on India, Asia and the Middle East, among them the following:
Pakistan Under Challenge
What About India?
The State of Israel
India in 1921-22: A report prepared for presentation to Parliament in accordance with the requirements of the 26th Section of the Government of India Act
An Empire Builder of the Sixteenth Century: A Summary Account of the Political Career of Zahir-Ud-Din Muhammad, Surnamed Babur
Ethnic diversity in India
The black hills: Kutch in history and legend: a study in Indian local loyalties
Handbook for Travellers in India, Pakistan and Nepal
The East Pakistan tragedy
The State of Pakistan
Great Men of India

Notes

External links
 

British expatriates in India
British historians of religion
20th-century British writers
1890 births
1978 deaths
Commanders of the Order of the British Empire